Samuel Hoppus Adams (1835-1895) was a British surgeon, physician and botanist.

Life
Adams was born in Yardley Hastings in 1835 and christened on 21 June 1835. He was educated at Bedford Modern School and matriculated at University College London where he achieved a gold medal in Structural and Physiological Botany. He became a member of the Royal College of Surgeons in 1858, and subsequently studied medicine and graduated MB (first division) in 1859, and MD in 1861.

After graduating, Adams served as a surgeon for The Peninsular and Oriental Steam Navigation Company. During his time there he suffered extreme sunstroke on the Red Sea. He later settled in Bedford where he initially practised in partnership and then independently. He was surgeon to the Bedford Provident Dispensary. In terms of his medical service in Bedford it was commented that:

In the field of botany, he gave informal tuition to William Hillhouse, Edward Mann Langley and Joseph Reynolds Green, which helped all three to obtain scholarships to Trinity College, Cambridge.

Adams married Caroline England in London in 1880; they had three children. He died in Bedford on 1 March 1895 and was buried in accordance with the rites of the Moravian Church. His obituary in the British Medical Journal stated that:

References 

1835 births
1895 deaths
19th-century British medical doctors
Alumni of University College London
People educated at Bedford Modern School